Substituted methylenedioxy- phenethylamines (MDxx) are a large chemical class of derivatives of the phenethylamines, which includes many psychoactive drugs that act as entactogens, psychedelics, and/or stimulants, as well as entheogens.  These agents are used as research chemicals, designer drugs and as recreational substances.

The base compound of the MDxx class is 3,4-methylenedioxyphenethylamine (MDPEA), and the prototypical agent of this class is 3,4-methylenedioxy-N-methylamphetamine (MDMA; "ecstasy"). Other mentionables include 3,4-methylenedioxyamphetamine (MDA), 3,4-methylenedioxy-N-ethylamphetamine (MDEA; "Eve"), N-methyl-1,3-benzodioxolylbutanamine (MBDB; "Eden"), and 3,4-methylenedioxy-N-methylcathinone (βk-MDMA; "Methylone").

List of substituted methylenedioxyphenethylamines 

The compounds most commonly regarded as comprising the family of MDxx derivatives include:

Related compounds
In addition, there are a number of other compounds that have some structural and pharmacological similarities to the methylenedioxyphenethylamines, and are useful for comparison. These can be broadly divided into (i) compounds where the methylenedioxyphenyl ring is retained but the phenethyl portion is modified, or (ii) compounds which retain the 3,4-cyclised amphetamine core common to the MDxx compounds, but have the 1,3-benzodioxole ring replaced by related heterocycles.

See also
 2Cs, DOx, 25-NB
 Substituted amphetamines
 Substituted benzofurans
 Substituted cathinones
 Substituted phenethylamines
 Substituted phenmetrazines
 Substituted tryptamines
 Substituted α-alkyltryptamines

References

External links
 PiHKAL ("Phenethylamines i Have Known And Loved") by Alexander "Sasha" Shulgin (1991)
 Psychotomimetic Drugs: Structure-Activity Relationships by Alexander "Sasha" Shulgin (1978)
 Mescaline: The Chemistry and Pharmacology of its Analogues by Alexander "Sasha" Shulgin (1972)

Chemical classes of psychoactive drugs